= 1975 Saga gubernatorial election =

Election for Governor of Saga Prefecture

- 13 April 1975
| Nominee | Sunao Ikeda | Isei Ide |
| Party | Independent | Independent |
| Popular vote | 264,893 | 216,874 |
Governor before election
Sunao Ikeda
Independent
Elected Governor
Sunao Ikeda
Independent

A gubernatorial election was held on 13 April 1975 to elect the Governor of Saga Prefecture.

== Candidates ==
- Sunao Ikeda - incumbent Governor of Saga Prefecture, age 73
- Isei Ide - former member of the House of Representatives, age 65

== Results ==
Saga Gubernational Election 1975
| Party | Candidate | Votes | % | ±% |
|---|---|---|---|---|
| Independent | Sunao Ikeda (incumbent) | 264,893 | | |
| Independent | Isei Ide | 216,874 | | |
